Soudougui   is a department or commune of Koulpélogo Province in eastern Burkina Faso. Its capital is the town of Soudougui. According to the 2019 census the department has a total population of 92,179.

Towns and villages
 Soudougui (2 456 inhabitants) (capital)
 Bagmoussa (1 024 inhabitants) 
 Boudangou (4 995 inhabitants) 
 Boudou (816 inhabitants) 
 Diakarga (1 643 inhabitants) 
 Diakarga-Peulh (561 inhabitants) 
 Dienbende (3 376 inhabitants) 
 Dienbende–Diori (978 inhabitants) 
 Kamse (1 892 inhabitants) 
 Kandaghin (520 inhabitants) 
 Kianghin (498 inhabitants) 
 Koadjidjoal (169 inhabitants) 
 Konianwende (383 inhabitants) 
 Koudiorgou (1 516 inhabitants) 
 Koulpalga (874 inhabitants) 
 Koulsonde (1 600 inhabitants) 
 Koultianga (1 117 inhabitants) 
 Konyelenbere (307 inhabitants) 
 Modaogo (2 450 inhabitants) 
 Nabangou (1 155 inhabitants) 
 Naloanga (1 047 inhabitants) 
 Napade (2 804 inhabitants) 
 Napiga (427 inhabitants) 
 Noulibouli (388 inhabitants) 
 Pilogre (720 inhabitants) 
 Sandiaba (1 248 inhabitants) 
 Sisse (451 inhabitants) 
 Sitipiga (1 432 inhabitants) 
 Sologo (1 247 inhabitants) 
 Soudoubila (1 591 inhabitants) 
 Vilianga-Gourma (1 113 inhabitants) 
 Vilianga-Mossi (2 383 inhabitants) 
 Waidjoaga (1 474 inhabitants) 
 Waidjoaga-Peulh (302 inhabitants) 
 Yoabghin (1 371 inhabitants) 
 Youanga (212 inhabitants) 
 Zongo (674 inhabitants) 
 Zoungou-Peulh (107 inhabitants)

References

Departments of Burkina Faso
Koulpélogo Province